Massiel Indira Taveras Henríquez (born 7 July 1984 in Santiago de los Caballeros) is a Dominican presenter, designer, actress and beauty pageant titleholder who was crowned Miss Dominican Republic 2007 and represented her country at Miss Universe 2007.

Personal life
Born in Santiago de los Caballeros, Massiel is daughter of Damían Taveras and Carmen Henríquez de Taveras. She has six siblings, among them, the conductor of television and ex- queen of beauty Rita Isaura Taveras. She is a graduate of Pontificia Universidad Católica Madre y Maestra. Massiel Taveras moved to Hollywood to pursue acting.

Pageant participation

Miss Dominican Republic 2007
Taveras competed at Miss Dominican Republic 2007 on March 22, 2007, representing Santiago, where she was crowned the winner by Mía Taveras (her cousin).

Miss Universe 2007
Massiel competed at the Miss Universe 2007 pageant on May 28, 2007 in Mexico City. Although among of the favorites Taveras did not place.

Reina Hispanoamericana 2007
On October 26 Taveras was crowned Reina Hispanoamericana 2007 during an event held in Santa Cruz, Bolivia ; she also won the most beautiful face award and best figure award.

References

Sources
 Masiel Taveras (Photo)

Dominican Republic beauty pageant winners
Dominican Republic television presenters
Dominican Republic women television presenters
Living people
Miss Dominican Republic
Miss Universe 2007 contestants
1984 births